Langdon Colbourne (15 September 1835 – 16 September 1889) was an English cathedral organist, who served at Hereford Cathedral.

Background

Colbourne was born in Hackney, London, the son of Thomas Colborne and Elizabeth Hobson. He was baptised at an independent (nonconformist) church in November 1835.

He studied organ under George Cooper. He died in Hereford in 1889 aged 54.

Career

Organist of:
St. Michael's College, Tenbury 1860–1874
Beverley Minster 1874–1875
Wigan Parish Church 1875–1877
Dorking Parish Church 1877–1890
Truro Cathedral 1890–1920

References

English classical organists
British male organists
Cathedral organists
1835 births
1889 deaths
People from Hackney Central
19th-century English musicians
19th-century British male musicians
19th-century classical musicians
Male classical organists
19th-century organists